

Minium, also known as red lead,  is a bright orange red pigment that was widely used in the Middle Ages for the decoration of manuscripts and for painting.  It was made by roasting white lead pigment in the air;  the white lead would gradually turn yellow, then into an orange lead tetroxide.  The color varied depending upon how long the mineral was roasted.

During the Roman Empire, the term minium could refer either to the pigment made from ground cinnabar or to the less expensive red lead. The name came from the river Minius in Iberia (now forming part of the Spanish-Portuguese border and known as Miño or Minho), located near the main Roman cinnabar mines. Pliny the Elder referred to it as flammeus, or flame color.  The minium of red lead was easy to make and less expensive than the pigment made from the mineral cinnabar, and it was bright and cheerful, so it became the most commonly used bright red in Medieval painting despite being poisonous, and sometimes turning black in impure air. The use of red lead phased out with the introduction of vermilion from the 11th century.

The color was used in particular for the paragraph signs, versals, capitals, and headings which were colored red in medieval manuscripts. The Latin verb for this kind of work was miniare, to apply minium, and a person who did this was known as a miniator.  These medieval artists also made small illustrations and decorative drawings in the manuscripts, which became known as miniatures, the source of the English word for small works of art.

There was (and is) considerable confusion among the names of ancient and medieval pigments.  As noted above, the term minium was used for cinnabar, vermilion, and for red lead.  Minium of red lead was sometimes called stupium in classical Latin, adding to the confusion.

Minium may have been manufactured in China as early as 300 B.C.  It was known in the Han Dynasty (200 BC-200 AD) under the name "cinnabar of lead" (ch'ien tan),  The process of manufacturing it was described in a Chinese manuscript of the 5th century.   Minium was widely used for Persian miniature painting and Indian miniature painting.

Minium is commonly used in Russia, where it called Surik, Norway, India and China. Oil based red lead paints are used to protect ships, railroad cars and all sorts of steel constructions from corrosion. Minium bonds with iron creating a protective oxide layer that resists corrosion even in salt water.

Gallery

See also
 List of inorganic pigments
 Red pigments

References

Notes and citations

Bibliography

Inorganic pigments
Shades of orange
Shades of red